Stanna hos mig is a 2010 studio album by Swedish band Drifters, mostly consisting of older cover songs.

Track listing

Drifters 
Erica Sjöström – vocals, saxophone & accordion
Mattias Berghorn – drums, vocals
Ronny Nilsson – guitar, vocals
Stellan Hedevik – keyboard
Henrik Wallrin – bass

Production and arrangement: Henrik Sethson
A & R: Jakob Ekendahl
Mixed by: Plec in Panic-Room. mastered by Dragan Tanasković
Photo: Thomas Harrysson
Design: Anders Bühlund, Forma
Drifters engaged through: YBM Nöjesproduktion, Alingsås

Charts

References 

Stanna hos mig album lines, Drifters 2010

2010 albums
Drifters (Swedish band) albums
Swedish-language albums